Oscar's Oasis (known as  in French and  in Welsh) is a computer animated comedy television series consisting of 78 7-minute episodes. It was produced by TeamTO and Tuba Entertainment, in association with Boutique Filmes, Cake Entertainment, and  Synergy Media  with the participation of TF1, in coproduction with Canal+ Family, Télétoon+, Cartoon Network and TV Cultura, EBS, BENEX, and Carrimages 5, and the support of National Center of Cinematography and the moving image (CNC), the Rhône-Alpes Region, the Poitou-Charentes region and Korea Creative Content Agency (KOCCA). Although the series contains no dialogue, it features the voices of Marie Facundo, Sly Johnson, Martial Le Minoux and Jérémy Prevost.

Originally, the series started out as a short simply called, Oasis, which then later became a series that was called Ooohhh Asis, and was composed of seven one-minute-and-a-half episodes, which were broadcast on 26 March 2008 from TF1. Oscar's Oasis debuted in its new format at the 2010 MIPTV Media Market. The series premiered on Canal+ and Canal+ Family in September 2010, and was broadcast on TF1 since late summer 2011. In July 2011, the series was released on Nintendo 3DS in 3D. The show started airing on Gulli on July 2, 2019.

Synopsis
Oscar is a lizard living in a non-specific desert that has features from several different real deserts, like the Sahara, Kalahari Desert, and North American deserts. An asphalt concrete highway runs through the area, used from time to time by various cargo trucks. Oscar is generally searching for food or water; he sometimes discovers liquid, in bottles or elsewhere, but is usually frustrated from recovering it for drink. An oasis supplies the only fresh water in the area, but its thick population of irascible and hungry crocodiles renders it inaccessible. At considerable personal risk (lizard is a delicacy for chickens), Oscar occasionally manages to steal an egg from a nearby hen coop, and he sometimes explores one of the piles of trash that litter the parched landscape. The Trio, which involves Buck, a vulture; Harchi, a hyena; & Popy, a fennec fox, inhabit a derelict school bus situated on a neighboring hill, but they mostly race about on a cast-off warehouse or grocery cart powered by Harchi and directed by Popy. Like Oscar, the trio constantly search for food and water - often competing with him, sometimes abusing him as a means, but occasionally cooperating with him when it suits their purpose. The main characters often find themselves falling off cliffs a la Wile E. Coyote chasing the Road Runner, wherein the law of gravity is briefly suspended while the character comes to realize their imminent doom.

Characters

Main characters
The four main characters are:
 Oscar (voiced by Marie Facundo) is the main character of the show. He is a gecko that is always getting into trouble with the trio – Buck, Harchi and Popy – and the chickens too. Oscar is always trying to catch flies and find some water, but most of the time things don't come out right. Whenever he has something interesting, the trio always tries to take it from him. Whilst he in turn often tries to steal the trio's food. In Oasis & Ooohhh Asis, he had no name.
 The Trio:
 Buck (voiced by Sly Johnson) a vulture, the brain of the Trio. This guy tolerates when Harchi gets yelled at by Popy. In Oasis & Ooohhh Asis, he was originally called Burk.
 Harchi (voiced by Sly Johnson) a hyena, the brawn of the Trio, he is given the physical jobs. He normally acts as the driving force behind the makeshift cart that he and his friends use to chase Oscar or the chickens. In the event of them taking a collective tumble, Harchi typically catches everyone so they avoid the ravine. Sometimes he can also show stupidity.
 Popy (voiced by Marie Facundo) a fennec fox, the leader of the Trio, the one who strategizes and gives directions. She is clever and sneaky, tricking the other animals as well as the two others in the trio. As shown in the episodes Pronto Express, Forbidden Paradise, and Bad Seed, she is also greedy. In Oasis & Ooohhh Asis, she was originally called Panic.

Minor characters
 Manolo (voiced by Martial Le Minoux) a truck driver who transports various items in the series. He is always asleep at the wheel while his dog, Roco, drives.
 Roco - Manolo's loyal and faithful dog. He always tries to keep their cargo safe and frequently chases Oscar and the trio or tries to deter them from the contents of the moving vehicle. He is generally more friendly with Oscar than with the trio.
 Lizardette - a female lizard to whom Oscar's heart belongs, though they sometimes compete with each other over things. In the episode Corn to be Wild, she has babies, but it's unknown who her mate is.
 The Chickens - their half-closed eyes give them a nonchalant, blasé appearance. They fall blindly into the traps laid for them, and get out of them without realizing they have escaped any kind of danger. They always try to eat Oscar.
 The Crocodiles - the most feared animals of the desert and the top predators.
 The Skunk - He doesn't smell good. He is always afraid of Oscar, but the trio are always afraid of him because of his smell. He often takes the trio's fruit.
 The Meerkats - The "Thieves" of the desert, they sometimes steal stuff from the trio as they compete with Oscar. In some episodes, however, they work together with Oscar against the trio.
 The Dung Beetles - Oscar's friends who occasionally help him out of tough predicaments. In the episode Revenge of the Small Fry, Oscar once helped them roll up a large ball of dung, which they have never forgotten.
 Junior - Oscar's adopted son who made only one appearance in the show.
The Fly - Oscar's dessert which he eats after a meal. The fly is quick and isn't always eaten by Oscar.

Episodes
Each episode runs for 7 minutes and there is one episode in Oasis, 7 episodes in Ooohhh Asis, & 78 episodes in Oscar's Oasis, which is 86 episodes total.

Oasis

Ooohhh Asis

Oscar's Oasis

Influence 

References

External links
 
 

2010s children's television series
2010s French animated television series
2010s South Korean animated television series
French children's animated comedy television series
French computer-animated television series
Animated television series without speech
South Korean children's animated comedy television series
Discovery Kids original programming
Cartoon Network original programming
Fictional mute characters
Animated television series about reptiles and amphibians
Animated television series about foxes
Animated television series about birds
Animated television series about mammals